Oluwatomiwo Ameobi (born 16 August 1988) is an English former professional footballer who played as a forward.

Having come through the youth academy at Leeds United, he went on to play in the Football League for Scunthorpe United, Doncaster Rovers, Grimsby Town and Mansfield Town before appearing for Non-League sides Forest Green Rovers and Whitley Bay. In 2011 he moved to play in Europe and had spells in Iceland and Finland with BÍ/Bolungarvík, Grindavík and VPS. In 2014 Ameobi moved to North America and had spells with both FC Edmonton and FC Cincinnati.

Career
The 2007–08 season was Ameobi's first campaign in the Leeds United first team. He previously played for the club's reserve side, which finished sixth in Division One Central of the Central League in 2006–07. Ameobi signed his first professional contract with Leeds United on 8 August 2007. He had been offered the contract on 8 May, but had to wait three months to sign the deal as the club had been placed under a transfer embargo.

He made his first appearance of the pre-season in Leeds United's 2–0 defeat against Northern Premier League side Guiseley on 6 August. He started the match, which was the club's final pre-season fixture, and was replaced after 75 minutes. Ameobi made his debut for Leeds on 28 August, against Portsmouth in the Football League Cup. He was loaned out to the Championship side Scunthorpe United in November 2007. 

Ameobi returned to Leeds before joining Doncaster on 22 July. On 24 September 2008, he was loaned to Football League Two side Grimsby Town. He later returned to Doncaster after just two appearances. Ameobi signed for Conference National outfit Mansfield Town on loan in January 2009. He returned to Doncaster the following month, having played five games for Mansfield, but was released from his contract on 7 May.

In September 2009, Ameobi signed for Forest Green Rovers. He scored his first goal for the club in a 3–2 away win over Hayes & Yeading in January 2010 and also in that month represented Forest Green in the 3rd round of the FA Cup against Notts County. At the end of the season he was released by the club having made 28 league appearances and having scored 5 times.

In July 2010, it was announced that Ameobi was on trial with Whitley Bay. He subsequently signed a contract for the club having impressed in their pre-season friendlies. On 4 September 2010, he featured in the 2–2 draw away at Billingham Synthonia coming on as a half-time substitute. Later in the season Ameobi returned to the side, making appearances during Bay's title challenge against Jarrow Roofing and Newcastle Benfield.

On 14 May 2011, Ameobi played his first game in an Icelandic league, and there in the second division. Ameobi's opponents were ÍR, but BÍ/Bvk. lost the game on Torfnesvöllur, 1–2. He scored BÍ/Bvk.'s goal in the game. Ameobi scored again in the second match of the season, winning Haukar away at Ásvellir, 2–1.

On 12 April 2013, Ameobi signed a 1+1 year contract with Finnish League team Vaasan Palloseura.

After his contract with Finnish team Vaasan Palloseura expired, he returned to Whitley Bay. Ameobi played his debut, after his return to Whitley Bay, on 28 December 2013 against Guisborough Town.

Ameobi signed with NASL club FC Edmonton on 31 March 2014. He scored on his debut in a 1–1 draw with the Tampa Bay Rowdies. Ameobi would spend four seasons in Edmonton. After the 2017 season, with the future of FC Edmonton and the NASL in doubt, Ameobi was released from FC Edmonton. Ameobi would leave Edmonton as the club's second all-time leading scorer.

On 21 February 2018, Ameobi signed with USL side FC Cincinnati for the 2018 season.

On 31 January 2019, Ameobi returned for a second spell with FC Edmonton after the club joined the Canadian Premier League.

Personal life
Ameobi was born in Newcastle upon Tyne, Tyne and Wear. Ameobi is the younger brother of  striker Shola Ameobi and the older brother of former Middlesbrough winger Sammy Ameobi.

Ameobi now lives in Canada and is a qualified solicitor, having graduated from the Open University.

Career statistics

References

External links

1988 births
Living people
Footballers from Newcastle upon Tyne
English footballers
Association football forwards
Black British sportsmen
English expatriate footballers
Expatriate footballers in Iceland
English expatriate sportspeople in Iceland
Expatriate footballers in Finland
English expatriate sportspeople in Finland
Expatriate soccer players in Canada
English expatriate sportspeople in Canada
Expatriate soccer players in the United States
English expatriate sportspeople in the United States
Newcastle United F.C. players
Leeds United F.C. players
Scunthorpe United F.C. players
Doncaster Rovers F.C. players
Grimsby Town F.C. players
Mansfield Town F.C. players
Forest Green Rovers F.C. players
Tomi Ameobi
Tomi Ameobi
Vaasan Palloseura players
Whitley Bay F.C. players
FC Edmonton players
FC Cincinnati (2016–18) players
English Football League players
National League (English football) players
North American Soccer League players
USL Championship players
Canadian Premier League players
Tomi Ameobi
1. deild karla players
Veikkausliiga players
Tomi